Cunninghame South (Gaelic: Coineagan a Deas) is a constituency of the Scottish Parliament (Holyrood) covering part of the council area of North Ayrshire. It elects one Member of the Scottish Parliament (MSP) by the first past the post method of election, and is one of ten constituencies in the West Scotland electoral region. The regions elects seven additional members, in addition to the ten constituency MSPs, to produce a form of proportional representation for the region as a whole.

The seat has been held by Ruth Maguire of the Scottish National Party (SNP) since the 2016 Scottish Parliament election.

Electoral region 

The other nine constituencies of the West Scotland region are Clydebank and Milngavie, Cunninghame North, Dumbarton, Eastwood, Greenock and Inverclyde, Paisley, Renfrewshire North and West, Renfrewshire South and Strathkelvin and Bearsden.

The region covers part of the Argyll and Bute council area, the East Dunbartonshire council area, the East Renfrewshire council area, the Inverclyde council area, North Ayrshire council area, the Renfrewshire council area and the West Dunbartonshire council area.

Constituency boundaries and council area 

The constituency is one of two in North Ayrshire, with the rest of the council area being covered by the Cunninghame North constituency.

Cunninghame South was created at the same time as the Scottish Parliament, in 1999, using the name and boundaries of an  existing Westminster constituency. In 2005 Scottish constituencies for Westminster (House of Commons) were mostly replaced with new constituencies, causing Westminster and Holyrood constituency to no longer correspond.

Following their First Periodic review into constituencies to the Scottish Parliament in time for the 2011 Scottish Parliament election, the Boundary Commission for Scotland altered the boundaries of the constituency. The electoral wards used in the current creation of Cunninghame South are:

In full: 
Irvine West
Irvine East
Kilwinning
Irvine South
In part: (shared with Cunninghame North)
Stevenston
Saltcoats

Constituency profile and voting patterns

Constituency profile 
The Cunninghame South constituency occupies the southern portion of the North Ayrshire Council area, covering the towns of Kilwinning, Stevenston and Irvine.

Voting patterns 
The area has traditionally been represented by the Labour Party, with Labour continuously representing the Central Ayrshire and Cunninghame South constituencies at the British Parliament from 1959 until 2015 - when the constituency of Central Ayrshire was won by the Scottish National Party on a 27.7% swing from Labour to SNP. In the Scottish Parliament Cunninghame South was represented by the Labour Party from the establishment of the Scottish Parliament in 1999 until 2011, when the seat was gained by the SNP on a 9.9% swing.

Member of the Scottish Parliament

Election results

2020s

2010s

2000s

1990s

Footnotes

External links

Constituencies of the Scottish Parliament
1999 establishments in Scotland
Constituencies established in 1999
Scottish Parliament constituencies and regions 1999–2011
Scottish Parliament constituencies and regions from 2011
Politics of North Ayrshire
Ardrossan−Saltcoats−Stevenston
Kilwinning
Irvine, North Ayrshire